Deutscher Erzählerpreis (2008) is a literary prize of Germany.

German literary awards